A subsistence economy is an economy directed to basic subsistence (the provision of food, clothing, shelter) rather than to the market. Henceforth, "subsistence" is understood as supporting oneself at a minimum level. Often, the subsistence economy is moneyless and relies on natural resources to provide for basic needs through hunting, gathering, and agriculture. In a subsistence economy, economic surplus is minimal and only used to trade for basic goods, and there is no industrialization.
In hunting and gathering societies, resources are often if not typically underused.

In human history, before the first cities, all humans lived in a subsistence economy.  As urbanization, civilization, and division of labor spread, various societies moved to other economic systems at various times.  Some remain relatively unchanged, ranging from uncontacted peoples, to marginalized areas of developing countries, to some cultures that choose to retain a traditional economy.

Capital can be generally defined as assets invested with the expectation that their value will increase, usually because there is the expectation of profit, rent, interest, royalties, capital gain or some other kind of return. However, this type of economy cannot usually become wealthy by virtue of the system, and instead requires further investments to stimulate economic growth. In other words, a subsistence economy only possesses enough goods to be used by a particular nation to maintain its existence and provides little to no surplus for other investments. 

It is common for a surplus capital to be invested in social capital such as feasting.

Strategies

 Hunting and gathering techniques, also known as foraging:
 Artisan fishing —  a term which particularly applies to coastal or island ethnic groups using traditional techniques for subsistence fishing.
Aboriginal whaling, including the subsistence hunting of the bowhead whale in the Arctic.
 Agriculture:
 Horticulture — plant cultivation, based on the use of simple tools. 
 Subsistence agriculture — agricultural cultivation involving continuous use of arable (crop) land, and is more labor-intensive than horticulture.
 Pastoralism, the raising of grazing animals:
 Pastoral nomadism — all members of the pastoral society follow the herd throughout the year.
 Transhumance or agro-pastoralism — part of the society follows the herd, while the other part maintains a home village.
 Ranch agriculture — non-nomadic pastoralism with a defined territory.
 Distribution and exchange:
 Redistribution 
 Reciprocity — exchange between social equals. 
 Potlatching — a widely studied ritual in which sponsors (helped by their entourages) gave away resources and manufactured wealth while generating prestige for themselves.
 LETS — Local Exchange Trading Systems.
A parasitical society, subsisting on the produce of a separate host society:
 Raiding
 Conquest
 Garbage picking, when subsisting in a larger economy

See also

 Amish
 Anthropological theories of value
 Back-to-the-land movement
 Famine
 Lasse Nordlund
 Mahatma Gandhi
 Natural economy
 Poverty
 Shakers
 Simple living
 Staple food
 Society
 Subsistence crisis
 Tiny house movement

References

Economic systems
Agricultural economics

de:Subsistenzwirtschaft